Trochozonites is a genus of air-breathing land snails, terrestrial gastropod mollusks in the family Urocyclidae.

Species 
Species within the genus Trochozonites include:
 Trochozonites adansoniae (Morelet, 1848)
 Trochozonites adoxus Connolly, 1925
 Trochozonites aillyi Pilsbry, 1919
 Trochozonites bellula (E. von Martens, 1892)
 Trochozonites buhambaensis Preston, 1914
 Trochozonites crenulata (Germain, 1905)
 Trochozonites dioryx (Melvill & Ponsonby, 1892)
 Trochozonites expatriata Preston, 1914
 Trochozonites kempi Preston, 1914
 Trochozonites leptalea E. A. Smith, 1909
 Trochozonites medjensis Pilsbry, 1919
 Trochozonites percostulata Dupuis & Putzeys, 1901
 Trochozonites plumaticostata Pilsbry, 1919
 Trochozonites prestoni Connolly, 1925
 Trochozonites trifilaris Dupuis & Putzeys, 1901
 Trochozonites usambarensis Verdcourt, 1982
Species brought into synonymy
 † Trochozonites arabica Neubert & Van Damme, 2012  : synonym of † Sagdellina arabica (Neubert & Van Damme, 2012)  (new combination)

References 

 Pilsbry, H.A. (1919). A review of the land mollusks of the Belgian Congo chiefly based on the collections of the American Museum Congo Expedition, 1909-1915. Bulletin of the American Museum of Natural History, 40: 1-370, pls I-XXIII.
 Bank, R. (2017). Classification of the Recent terrestrial Gastropoda of the World. Last update: July 16th, 2017

Urocyclidae
Taxonomy articles created by Polbot